Canneto is a village and civil parish (frazione) of the Italian municipality of Caronia, in the Province of Messina, Sicily. In Italian language its name means reed bed.

Geography
The village, also known as Canneto di Caronia, is located by the Tyrrhenian coast, on the state highway 113 Messina-Palermo-Trapani, between Marina di Caronia and Santo Stefano di Camastra. It is 10 km from Caronia, 105 from Palermo and 125 from Messina.

It is crossed by the Messina-Palermo railway but lacks its own station (nearest are Caronia and Santo Stefano di Camastra-Mistretta). The nearest motorway's exit is "Reitano-Santo Stefano di Camastra", on the A20 Messina-Palermo

History

Canneto di Caronia fires

In 2004–2005 and 2014, there were two series of unusual fires in Canneto. While popular speculation ascribed the fires to various causes, including an unknown natural phenomenon,  paranormal events or secret military technology, official investigations suggested that all of these fires were cases of arson and arrests were made in 2015.

Starting from 14 January 2004, Canneto was the central location in a series of spontaneous fires (mainly along the railway line), and other electromagnetic phenomena. Appliances, starting with a television and evidently including a cooker and vacuum cleaner, were reported to catch fire spontaneously. Fires also struck wedding presents and a piece of furniture. At least one person was said to have observed an unplugged electrical cable ignite while he was directly observing it. ENEL, the Italian power utility, temporarily cut off the town's power supply, although the outbreaks continued. The fires stopped in August.

The fires were linked to poltergeists. Suggestions that the cause was an unknown natural phenomenon prompted an investigation by scientists from the National Research Institute (CNR), with the support of NASA physicists. In 2007 it was proposed that the phenomena were caused by intermittent electromagnetic emissions. A state of emergency was imposed and part of the village was evacuated. On 24 June 2008, following further investigation by the appointed experts, the case was dismissed by the prosecutor of Mistretta. The conclusion of the consultants was that the fires were arson cases.

Mysterious fires returned again in mid-2014.
On March 5, 2015, police arrested and charged Giuseppe Pezzino, 26, with arson, conspiracy to commit fraud, and sounding a false alarm in association with the mysterious fires.  His father, Antonino Pezzino, has also been implicated.  The Italian military police had installed hidden cameras in the streets after the fires started again in July 2014.  Video captured about 40 incidents implicating Giuseppe (and occasionally, Antonino). Further evidence was gathered by phone taps.

See also

Crime
 Camorra
 Sicilian Mafia
 Triangle of death (Italy)

Purported causes of the Canneto fires 
Electromagnetic radiation
 Electromagnetic pulse
 Terahertz radiation
 Far-infrared laser
  Terahertz metamaterials
 THz-wave radar
 Weapons/military technology
 Directed-energy weapon 
Electronic warfare
 Active Denial System
 Electronic countermeasure
 AN/ALQ-99
 Radar jamming and deception
 Electronic-warfare aircraft
 Boeing EA-18G Growler (US Navy)
 Tornado ECR (Italian Air Force)

Paranormal phenomena
 Pyrokinesis

References

External links
 Caronia municipal website

Frazioni of the Metropolitan City of Messina
Reportedly haunted locations in Italy